Paul Besson (born 1926) is a Swiss wrestler. He competed in the men's freestyle lightweight at the 1952 Summer Olympics.

References

External links

1926 births
Possibly living people
Swiss male sport wrestlers
Olympic wrestlers of Switzerland
Wrestlers at the 1952 Summer Olympics
Place of birth missing